= Cinematic Symphony =

Musical ensemble from Austin, Texas, United States

The Cinematic Symphony (formerly known as the Austin Wind Symphony) is a musical ensemble based in Austin, Texas. The group is composed of volunteers and is dedicated to preserving and performing the music of film and television.

The group was founded on June 7, 2005, by its original conductor, Patrick Phillips. The 50+-piece volunteer ensemble was assembled in an effort to create a stronger awareness of and appreciation for Film and Television scoring and its composers. The name was changed in 2010 to Cinematic Symphony. In addition to performing four to six concerts annually, the ensemble has also recorded numerous film scores. All concerts are free to the public, include very educational trivia questions and prizes, and costumes are always welcome.
